Hermann Wlach (11 August 1884 – 28 January 1962) was an Austrian stage and film actor.

Born Armin Wlach in Vienna, he died in 1962 at age 77 in Zollikon, Switzerland.

Filmography

Bibliography
 Evans, T.F. George Bernard Shaw: The Critical Heritage. Routledge, 1997.

External links

1884 births
1962 deaths
Austrian male film actors
Austrian male silent film actors
Austrian male stage actors
Male actors from Vienna
20th-century Austrian male actors